Motu Iti  (sometimes also called Hatu Iti) is one of the northern Marquesas Islands in French Polynesia.  Located west-northwest from Nuku Hiva, Motu Iti is the site of extensive seabird rookeries.

Motu Iti is administratively part of the commune (municipality) of Nuku-Hiva, itself in the administrative subdivision of the Marquesas Islands.

History
In 1814, four sailors from an American ship were stranded on the rocky island. One survived for three years until being rescued by a passing ship.

See also

 Desert island
 List of islands

References

Islands of the Marquesas Islands
Uninhabited islands of French Polynesia